40 (forty) is the natural number following 39 and preceding 41.

Though the word is related to "four" (4), the spelling "forty" replaced "fourty" in the course of the 17th century and is now the standard form.

In mathematics 
Forty is a composite number, a refactorable number, an octagonal number, and—as the sum of the first four pentagonal numbers: —it is a pentagonal pyramidal number. Adding up some subsets of its divisors (e.g., 1, 4, 5, 10, and 20) gives 40; hence, 40 is a semiperfect number.
Given 40, the Mertens function returns 0. 40 is the smallest number  with exactly nine solutions to the equation Euler's totient function .
Forty is a repdigit in ternary (1111, i.e., or, in other words) and a Harshad number in decimal.

In science
The atomic number of zirconium.
Negative forty is the unique temperature at which the Fahrenheit and Celsius scales correspond; that is, −40 °F = −40 °C. It is referred to as either "minus forty" or "forty below".

Astronomy
Messier object M40, a magnitude 9.0 double star in the constellation Ursa Major
The New General Catalogue object NGC 40, a magnitude 12.4 planetary nebula in the constellation Cepheus

In religion
The number 40 is found in many traditions without any universal explanation for its use. In Jewish, Christian, Islamic, and other Middle Eastern traditions it is taken to represent a large, approximate number, similar to "umpteen".

Sumerian
 Enki ( /ˈɛŋki/) or Enkil (Sumerian: dEN.KI(G)𒂗𒆠) is a god in Sumerian mythology, later known as Ea in Akkadian and Babylonian mythology. He was originally patron god of the city of Eridu, but later the influence of his cult spread throughout Mesopotamia and to the Canaanites, Hittites and Hurrians. He was the deity of crafts (gašam); mischief; water, seawater, lake water (a, aba, ab), intelligence (gestú, literally "ear") and creation (Nudimmud: nu, likeness, dim mud, make bear). He was associated with the southern band of constellations called stars of Ea, but also with the constellation AŠ-IKU, the Field (Square of Pegasus). Beginning around the second millennium BCE, he was sometimes referred to in writing by the numeric ideogram for "40", occasionally referred to as his "sacred number".

A large number of myths about Enki have been collected from many sites, stretching from Southern Iraq to the Levantine coast. He figures in the earliest extant cuneiform inscriptions throughout the region and was prominent from the third millennium down to Hellenistic times.

The exact meaning of his name is uncertain: the common translation is "Lord of the Earth": the Sumerian en is translated as a title equivalent to "lord"; it was originally a title given to the High Priest; ki means "earth"; but there are theories that ki in this name has another origin, possibly kig of unknown meaning, or kur meaning "mound". The name Ea is allegedly Hurrian in origin while others claim that it is possibly of Semitic origin and may be a derivation from the West-Semitic root *hyy meaning "life" in this case used for "spring", "running water". In Sumerian E-A means "the house of water", and it has been suggested that this was originally the name for the shrine to the God at Eridu.

Judaism
 In the Hebrew Bible, forty is often used for time periods, forty days or forty years, which separate "two distinct epochs".
 Rain fell for "forty days and forty nights" during the Flood (Genesis 7:4).
 Noah waited for forty days after the tops of mountains were seen after the flood, before releasing a raven (Genesis 8:5–7).
 Spies were sent by Moses to explore the land of Canaan (promised to the children of Israel) for "forty days" (Numbers 13:2, 25).
 The Hebrew people lived in the lands outside of the promised land for "forty years". This period of years represents the time it takes for a new generation to arise (Numbers 32:13).
 Several early Hebrew leaders and kings are said to have ruled for "forty years", that is, a generation. Examples include Eli (1 Samuel 4:18), Saul (Acts 13:21), David (2 Samuel 5:4), and Solomon (1 Kings 11:42).
 Goliath challenged the Israelites twice a day for forty days before David defeated him (1 Samuel 17:16).
 Moses spent three consecutive periods of "forty days and forty nights" on Mount Sinai:
 He went up on the seventh day of Sivan, after God gave the Torah to the Jewish people, in order to learn the Torah from God, and came down on the seventeenth day of Tammuz, when he saw the Jews worshiping the Golden Calf and broke the tablets (Deuteronomy 9:11).
 He went up on the eighteenth day of Tammuz to beg forgiveness for the people's sin and came down without God's atonement on the twenty-ninth day of Av (Deuteronomy 9:25).
 He went up on the first day of Elul and came down on the tenth day of Tishrei, the first Yom Kippur, with God's atonement (Deuteronomy 10:10).
 A mikvah consists of 40 se'ah (approximately ) of water
 The prophet Elijah had to walk 40 days and 40 nights before arriving at mount Horeb (1 Kings 19:8).
 40 lashes is one of the punishments meted out by the Sanhedrin (Deuteronomy 25:3), though in actual practice only 39 lashes were administered.
 (Numbers 14:33–34) alludes to the same with ties to the prophecy in The Book of Daniel. "For forty years—one year for each of the forty days you explored the land—you will suffer for your sins and know what it is like to have Me against you."
 One of the prerequisites for a man to study Kabbalah is that he is forty years old.
 "The registering of these men was carried on cruelly, zealously, assiduously, from the rising of the sun to its going down, and was not brought to an end in forty days" (3 Maccabees 4:15).
 Jonah warns Nineveh that "Forty days more, and Nineveh shall be overthrown." (Jonah 3:4)

Christianity
Christianity similarly uses forty to designate important time periods.

Moses stays on Mount Sinai for 40 days and nights (Exodus 24:18).
 Before his temptation, Jesus fasted "forty days and forty nights" in the Judean desert (Matthew 4:2, Mark 1:13, Luke 4:2).
 Forty days was the period from the resurrection of Jesus to the ascension of Jesus (Acts 1:3).
 According to Stephen, Moses' life is divided into three 40-year segments, separated by his growing to adulthood, fleeing from Egypt, and his return to lead his people out (Acts 7:23, 30, 36).
 In modern Christian practice, Lent consists of the 40 days preceding Easter. In much of Western Christianity, Sundays are excluded from the count, there are 46 days in total of Lent; in Eastern Christianity, Sundays are included.
 The Forty Martyrs of Sebaste
 Kirk Kilisse, "Forty Churches" (Σαράντα Εκκλησιές) in Eastern Thrace
 Rain fell for "forty days and forty nights" during the Flood (Genesis 7:4).

Islam
 Muhammad was forty years old when he first received the revelation delivered by the archangel Gabriel.
 Masih ad-Dajjal roams around the Earth in forty days, the first day length is like one year, the second day is like one month, the third day is like one week and the next day (until 40th day) is like one day.
 God forbade the Israelites from entering the Holy Land for 40 years to separate them from Musa (Moses) and his brother.
 Musa (Moses) spent 40 days on Mount Sinai where he received the 10 commandments.

Yazidism
 In the Yazidi faith, The Chermera Temple (meaning "40 Men" in the Yazidi dialect) is so old that no one remembers how it came to have that name but it is believed to derive from the burial of 40 men on the mountaintop site.

Funerary customs
 Some Russians, Bulgarians, and Serbs believe that ghosts of the dead linger at the site of their death for forty days. After the forty days, additional prayers are performed at the grave (parastos (парастос) or panihida (панихида)), to escort the soul on its way to God's court.
 Many Christian Filipinos mark the end of the initial mourning period on the fortieth day after death, and have a Mass said. They believe that the soul remains on the earthly plane for forty days before entering the afterlife, recalling how Christ ascended to heaven forty days after his Resurrection.

Hinduism
 In Hinduism, some popular religious prayers consist of forty shlokas or dohas (couplets, stanzas). The most common being the Hanuman Chalisa (chaalis is the Hindi term for 40).

In the Hindu system some of the popular fasting periods consist 40 days and is called the period One 'Mandala Kalam' Kalam means a period and Mandala Kalam means a period of 40 days. For example, the devotees (male and female) of Swami Ayyappa, the name of a Hindu god very popular in Kerala, India (Sabarimala Swami Ayyappan) strictly observed forty days fasting and visit (since female devotees of a certain biological age group wouldn't be able to perform the continuous 40-day-austerities, they wouldn't enter into the god's temple until September 2018) with their holy submission or offerings on 41st or a convenient day after a minimum 40 days practice of fasting. The offering is called "Kaanikka".

Buddhism 

 When discussing meditation, the Visuddhimagga suggests 40 meditation subjects to focus on.

Sikhism 

 Anand Sahib, the fifth and the final of the daily Sikh prayers have 40 paragraphs, and the 40th paragraph is often read when concluding any Sikh ceremony.
 Chali Mukte (40 liberated ones) refer to the 40 soldiers in the army of Guru Gobind Singh. These 40 disciples were the most favorite and beloved disciples of the Guru.

In entertainment

 "#40" is a song by Dave Matthews Band
 "40" is a song by Franz Ferdinand
 "40" is a 1983 song by U2 from their album War, whose lyrics are a modification of Psalm 40
 Crush 40 is an American-Japanese hard rock band featured in the Sonic the Hedgehog franchise produced by Sega and Sonic Team; their self-titled album is named after the band.
 The highest number counted to on Sesame Street 
 The number of positions on several radio countdown programs, notably American Top 40, American Country Countdown, and Rick Dees' Weekly Top 40
 Chefs are given a $40 budget in The Early Show segment "Chef on a Shoestring".
 Noah Shebib, the Canadian hip hop producer is also known as "40".
 "Forty Shades of Green", a song about Ireland, was written and recorded by Johnny Cash in 1961.
 Fortycoats & Co. was an Irish children's television drama series of the 1980s; the name is based on the nickname of a Dublin tramp, Johnny Fortycoats, of the 1930s.

In sports
 In baseball, each team in Major League Baseball is allowed to have 40 players under major-league contracts at any given time (not including players on the 60-day disabled list). From September 1 to the end of the regular season, teams were allowed to expand their game-day rosters to include the entire 40-man roster through the 2019 season, but from 2020 teams are only allowed 28 players on their game-day rosters during that period.
 In horse racing, the maximum permitted number of runners in the Grand National is 40.
 The 40-yard dash is an important metric in American football scouting.
 In tennis, the number 40 represents the third point gained in a game. A score of 40–40 (three points each) is called "deuce", at which time a player must score two consecutive points to win the game.
 In NASCAR, the number of cars that have run each race in the top-level Cup Series since 2016, and the second-level Xfinity Series since 2013.

In other fields

Forty is also:
 Kyrgyzstan is a country in  Central Asia and is derived from the Kyrgyz word meaning "Land of forty tribes". The number 40 is significant in Kyrgyz traditions and appears in many areas of Kyrgyz culture.
in the expression "forty winks", meaning a short sleep
in the trademark name of the penetrating oil and water-displacing spray WD-40; "WD-40" is an abbreviation of "Water Displacement, 40th formula".
the caliber of the bullet in a number of firearms cartridges, most notably the .40 S&W. (The 10mm Auto, although designated as metric caliber, uses the same caliber, and often uses the same bullets.)
the number of years of marriage celebrated by the ruby wedding anniversary
the code for direct dial international phone calls to Romania
the number of spaces in a standard Monopoly game board
the number of thieves in "Ali Baba and the Forty Thieves" and in Ali Shar and Zumurrud, from One Thousand and One Nights (both the numbers 40 and 1001 are more likely to mean "many" than to indicate a specific number)
the customary number of hours in a regular workweek in some Western countries
the number of weeks for an average term of pregnancy, counting from the woman's last menstrual period
a 40-ounce bottle of malt liquor, referenced in the song "40oz. to Freedom" by Sublime
The Tessarakonteres, or 40, the largest ship of antiquity, constructed by Ptolemy IV
Forty is the only integer whose English name has its letters in alphabetical order.
Forty Foot, a promontory on the southern tip of Dublin Bay, Ireland, from which people have been swimming in the Irish Sea all year round for some 250 years
After the Civil War, there were plans to offer freed slaves 40 acres and a mule.
To understand a people, you must live among them for 40 days. ~Arabic proverb
Quarantine, the practice of isolation to prevent the spread of epidemic disease, derives from a Venetian dialect of the Italian  meaning 'forty days', the period that ships were required to be isolated before passengers and crew could go ashore during the Black Death.
To qualify for retirement benefits under Social Security (United States), a person must have earnings for 40 quarters (equivalent to 10 years).
Forty-shilling freeholders, a nickname, given to those who qualified for a franchise, the right to vote, based on their interest in land and/or property with an annual rental value of 40s. Introduced in England in 1430, it applied there and in many associated territories, in various forms, up to 1918.

See also
 List of highways numbered 40
Yaldā Night, also known as Shab-e Chelleh, meaning "night of forty", celebrated in Iran on the night of the Northern Hemisphere's winter solstice

References

Further reading

External links

 

Integers